Hormotila is a genus of green algae in the family Chaetophoraceae.

Former family

Hormotila was formerly the type genus of the family Hormotilaceae. , AlgaeBase no longer included any genera in the family, although some sources listed the family but without the type genus.

References

External links

Chaetophorales genera
Chaetophoraceae